The USWA Middleweight Championship was a short-lived title in the United States Wrestling Association for the lighter wrestlers in 1993.

Title history

Footnotes

References

United States Wrestling Association championships
Middleweight wrestling championships